Mane Tandilyan (born 3 April 1978), is an Armenian historian and politician, Member of the National Assembly of Armenia and former Minister of Labour and Social Affairs of the Republic since 12 May 2018 until she resigned on 14 November 2018.

Biography
Born in the northern town of Alaverdi, she graduated in History in the Armenian State Pedagogical University in 1999. Three years later graduated in Business in the American University of Armenia and got a master's degree in Business Administration. In 2005 she founded and led the Armenian Council of the International European Movement. She is married with two children.

Political career
Since 15 December 2015 is member of the party Bright Armenia and on 22 December 2017 became Secretary of the party's Council.

In 2017 parliamentary election she was elected as a member of the National Assembly of the 6th convocation for Way Out Alliance.

On 11 May 2018, after the Velvet Revolution, she was appointed Minister of Labor and Social Affairs of Armenia. On 12 June 2018, against the introduction of the mandatory component of the cumulative pension system by the government, she resigned, but Prime Minister Pashinyan, on June 21, didn't accept her resignation and she would continue her term.

On 14 November 2018 she resigned as Minister of Labor and Social Affairs on December 9 to participate in 2018 parliamentary election, getting a seat in the National Assembly.

Mane Tandilyan currently leads the Country of Living party.

References

1978 births
Living people
21st-century Armenian historians
Government ministers of Armenia
Members of the National Assembly (Armenia)
Women government ministers of Armenia
Labor and Social Affairs ministers of Armenia
Armenian State Pedagogical University alumni
21st-century Armenian women politicians
21st-century Armenian politicians
Bright Armenia politicians